Baha ol Din (also Romanized as Bahā’ ol Dīn; also known as Bahādīnī) is a village in Kahnuk Rural District, Irandegan District, Khash County, Sistan and Baluchestan Province, Iran. At the 2006 census, its population was 15, in 4 families.

References 

Populated places in Khash County